Continental Croatia was one of the two NUTS-2 Regions of Croatia between 2013 and 2021. The region formed the continental part of the country. The most populated cities in the region were Zagreb, Osijek, Slavonski Brod, Karlovac, Sisak and Varaždin. It accounted for 56% of the country's territory and 67% of the population.

The existence of this large region that included the capital city of Zagreb was controversial in Croatia at the time, with public complaints on how it enabled an unjust distribution of European Union funding.

In 2021, it was replaced with three NUTS-2 regions: City of Zagreb, Northern Croatia and Pannonian Croatia.

See also
 NUTS statistical regions of Croatia

References

External links

Subdivisions of Croatia
NUTS 2 statistical regions of Croatia
NUTS 2 statistical regions of the European Union
Croatia